Aleksi Hämäläinen (born 30 November 1995) is a Finnish professional ice hockey forward currently playing for Iisalmen Peli-Karhut in Mestis. He is the younger brother of Aatu Hämäläinen.

Hämäläinen made his Liiga debut for KalPa during the 2015–16 season.

References

External links

1995 births
Living people
Finnish ice hockey forwards
Iisalmen Peli-Karhut players
KalPa players
People from Suonenjoki
Sportspeople from North Savo